The African scraping feeder (Labeobarbus beso) is a species of ray-finned fish in the  family Cyprinidae. It is found in Lake Tana, and the Blue Nile and Awash River systems in Africa. It feeds by scraping algae off from the bottom with its mouth.

References

Endemic fauna of Ethiopia
beso
Taxa named by Eduard Rüppell
Fish described in 1835